The Erren River is a river in Taiwan. It flows through Tainan City and Kaohsiung City for 61 km. The river originates from the Neimen District in Kaohsiung City and flows through seven districts before it enters Taiwan Strait. The river has suffered from pollution, although the situation has improved.

See also
List of rivers in Taiwan

References

Rivers of Taiwan
Landforms of Tainan
Landforms of Kaohsiung